Correctionville is a city in Woodbury County, Iowa, United States. It is part of the Sioux City, IA–NE–SD Metropolitan Statistical Area. The population was 766 at the time of the 2020 census. The town name comes from the original survey of the town. Correctionville has been noted for its unusual place name. It is supposedly the longest single-word place name in the state of Iowa.

History
Correctionville was platted in 1855. It was so named from its location on a surveyors' correction line, an east-west line between baselines required because of the Earth's curvature. A post office called Correctionville has been in operation since 1862.

Geography
Correctionville is located at  (42.476697, -95.784746). The town is situated adjacent to the Little Sioux River.

Demographics

2010 census
As of the census of 2010, there were 821 people, 331 households, and 208 families residing in the city. The racial makeup of the city was 97.2% White, 0.2% African American, 0.6% Native American, 0.9% Asian, 0.1% from other races, and 1.0% from two or more races. Hispanic or Latino of any race were 2.3% of the population.

There were 331 households, of which 29.0% had children under the age of 18 living with them, 49.2% were married couples living together, 8.5% had a female householder with no husband present, 5.1% had a male householder with no wife present, and 37.2% were non-families. 33.8% of all households were made up of individuals, and 17.8% had someone living alone who was 65 years of age or older. The average household size was 2.36 and the average family size was 3.00.

The median age in the city was 42.8 years. 22.8% of residents were under the age of 18; 8.2% were between the ages of 18 and 24; 21% were from 25 to 44; 25.4% were from 45 to 64; and 22.8% were 65 years of age or older. The gender makeup of the city was 51.0% male and 49.0% female.

2000 census
As of the census of 2000, there were 851 people, 343 households, and 230 families residing in the city. The racial makeup of the city was 97.65% White, 0.12% Native American, 0.24% Asian, 1.65% from other races, and 0.35% from two or more races. Hispanic or Latino of any race were 3.88% of the population.

There were 343 households, out of which 28.0% had children under the age of 18 living with them, 53.6% were married couples living together, 9.9% had a female householder with no husband present, and 32.9% were non-families. 30.0% of all households were made up of individuals, and 18.7% had someone living alone who was 65 years of age or older. The average household size was 2.38 and the average family size was 2.95.

Age/Gender Breakdown: 24.3% under the age of 18, 7.5% from 18 to 24, 23.0% from 25 to 44, 19.9% from 45 to 64, and 25.3% who were 65 years of age or older. The median age was 40 years. For every 100 females, there were 97.0 males. For every 100 females age 18 and over, there were 87.2 males.

The median income for a household in the city was $24,615, and the median income for a family was $35,000. Males had a median income of $28,250 versus $21,389 for females. The per capita income for the city was $16,074. About 12.6% of families and 17.4% of the population were below the poverty line, including 24.9% of those under age 18 and 13.1% of those age 65 or over.

Schools

The River Valley Community School District operates public schools serving the community. It was established on July 1, 1996 by the merger of the Eastwood Community School District and the Willow Community School District. The Eastwood school district itself was formed on July 1, 1966 by the merger of the Correctionville and Cushing school districts.

References

Cities in Woodbury County, Iowa
Cities in Iowa
Sioux City metropolitan area
1855 establishments in Iowa